John Michael Attenborough (1 January 1928 – 9 November 2012) was an English executive in the motor industry and then a financial adviser. He was the younger brother of director and actor Richard, Lord Attenborough, and the naturalist Sir David Attenborough.

Like his brothers, he was educated at Wyggeston Grammar School for Boys in Leicester.
After National Service, he studied modern languages at Clare College, Cambridge.
He worked in the motor trade and became a managing director of Mann Egerton, heading their Rolls-Royce division in Berkeley Street.  He then became the head of the British operations of Italian car manufacturer Alfa Romeo.  He finally ran a distribution business for motor cars in Dorset before retiring from the motor trade and becoming a financial adviser.

He was diagnosed with progressive supranuclear palsy (PSP) and died at his home in Poole, Dorset, on 9 November 2012, aged 84.

References

1928 births
2012 deaths
Alfa Romeo people
Alumni of Clare College, Cambridge
People educated at Wyggeston Grammar School for Boys
John
20th-century English businesspeople
Neurological disease deaths in England
Deaths from progressive supranuclear palsy